The tailspot corydoras (Corydoras caudimaculatus) is a tropical freshwater fish belonging to the Corydoradinae sub-family of the family Callichthyidae.  It originates in inland waters in South America, and is found in the Guaporé River basin in Brazil.

The fish will grow in length up to 1.6 inches (4.2 centimeters).  It lives in a tropical climate in water with a 6.0 - 8.0 pH, a water hardness of 2 - 25 dGH, and a temperature range of 72 - 79 °F (22 - 26 °C).  It feeds on worms, benthic crustaceans, insects, and plant matter.  It lays eggs in dense vegetation and adults do not guard the eggs.  The female carries the eggs in a pouch formed by the pelvic fins.

The tailspot corydoras is of commercial importance in the aquarium trade industry.

See also
 List of freshwater aquarium fish species

References

External links
 Photos at Fishbase

Corydoras
Fish described in 1961